The Minnesota Amateur Soccer League is an adult amateur soccer league featuring teams from the Twin Cities and the surrounding areas. The league is sanctioned by the United States Adult Soccer Association, an affiliate of the United States Soccer Federation.

History
Founded in 1953 as the Minnesota Soccer Association, the Minnesota Amateur Soccer League (MASL) is the oldest soccer association in Minnesota.

The state’s only sanctioned competitive soccer league for men changed its name to MASL in 1987 when the Minnesota Soccer Association (MSA) became Minnesota’s umbrella organization for adult soccer. In addition to MASL, Minnesota Soccer Association now includes the American Premier League (APL), Duluth Amateur Soccer League (DASL), Minnesota Recreational Soccer League (MRSL), Southern Minnesota Amateur Soccer Association (SMASA), Minnesota Senior Soccer League (MSSL) and the Minnesota Women’s Soccer League (MWSL).

The MSA, which began with four teams, spent its first 15 years as the only governing soccer body in Minnesota that was affiliated with the U.S. Soccer Federation. In 1968, a new youth soccer association, the Minnesota Junior Soccer Association, joined the MSA.

MASL has 41 teams and remains the premier amateur soccer league in the state. This prevalence is due in part to the strong reputation around the state and country as well as the vast number of MSA Hall of Fame members that continue to support the league.

Teams

Division 1
 Cardinals
 Dynamo FC
 FC Minnesota
 Fire SC
 Force FC
 Haaka
 Lions FC
 SPAM FC
 Stegman's 1977
 Vlora FC

Division 2
 Camargo FC
 Cougars
 Departivo Minnesota
 FC Shango
 Lewis Dragons
 Maple BUMS
 Scorpion Strikers FC 
 Stegman's Old Boys FC
 WB Burn
 Wolverines FC

Division 3
 Alloy BC
 Dukes
 Dynamo FC 18
 Force FC 19
 Lino FC
 Northrop United
 River City FC
 SPAM FC 09
 Stegman's Athletic
 Waconia FC

Division 4
 AFC Lexington Parkway
 Blackhawks
 K BC
 Karen FC
 Pirates FC
 Strikers FC
 Swan FC
 Thor FC
 V-Hawks
 Vlora FC II

Champions

NOTE: * = Division 3 (Group A, B, or C) winner. Division structure was changed in 2005 with the addition of Division 4.

Cup Tournaments
MASL sanction two cup tournaments annually. First played in 1962, Minnesota Cup is open to any adult soccer club in the state. Established in 1966, Wilson Cup is contested between clubs at the Division 2 level or lower.

References

External links
 MASL website
 @MASLorg Twitter
 Minnesota Soccer Association website

Soccer in Minnesota
United States Adult Soccer Association leagues
1953 establishments in Minnesota
Sports leagues established in 1953
Regional Soccer leagues in the United States